Impatiens auricoma is a species of flowering plant in the family Balsaminaceae. It is endemic to the Comoro Islands. Cultivars are available for use as ornamental plants.

References

auricoma
Endemic flora of the Comoros
Taxa named by Henri Ernest Baillon